Carlos Tapia may refer to:

 Carlos Daniel Tapia (born 1962), retired Argentine footballer
 Carlos Tapia (Chilean footballer) (born 1977), Chilean footballer for Barnechea